The Stockmine ("stick mine"), also Betonmine ("concrete mine"), was a German anti-personnel stake mine used during the Second World War. It consisted of a cylindrical concrete main body on top of a short wooden stake. The concrete head contained a small TNT bursting charge, and was embedded with a number of metal fragments. A fuze is fitted to a central fuze well on the top of the mine. It could be used with a range of fuzes including the ZZ 35, ZZ 42 and ZU ZZ 35 that would trigger on either a tripwire pull or release.

A number of copies of the mine were produced after the war by different countries including the Cuban PMFC-1, the Czechoslovakian PP-Mi-Sb, and the Yugoslavian PMR-2 which is found in Bosnia and Croatia.

Specifications

External links

References
 Brassey's Essential Guide to Anti-Personnel Landmines, Eddie Banks
 Jane's Mines and Mine Clearance 2005-2006

Anti-personnel mines
World War II weapons of Germany
Land mines of Germany